The Spoiler is an album by jazz saxophonist Stanley Turrentine recorded for the Blue Note label in 1966 and performed by Turrentine with Blue Mitchell, James Spaulding, Pepper Adams, McCoy Tyner, Julian Priester, Bob Cranshaw, and Mickey Roker with arrangements by Duke Pearson.

Reception

The Allmusic review by Scott Yanow awarded the album 4½ stars and states "despite some potentially indifferent material, Turrentine is in fine form throughout the date".

Track listing
 "The Magilla" (Duke Pearson) – 6:06
 "When the Sun Comes Out" (Harold Arlen, Ted Koehler) – 6:00
 "La Fiesta" (Armando Boza) – 5:05
 "Sunny" (Bobby Hebb) – 7:23
 "Maybe September (Theme from the Oscar)" (Ray Evans, Percy Faith, Jay Livingston) – 4:46
 "You're Gonna Hear From Me" (André Previn, Dory Previn) – 5:21
 "Lonesome Lover" (Billy Eckstine, Max Roach) – 4:38 Bonus track on CD

Personnel
Stanley Turrentine – tenor saxophone
Blue Mitchell – trumpet
Julian Priester – trombone
James Spaulding – alto saxophone, flute
Pepper Adams – baritone saxophone
McCoy Tyner – piano
Bob Cranshaw – bass, electric bass
Mickey Roker – drums
Joseph Rivera – percussion (tracks 1,3 & 4)
Duke Pearson – arranger

Production
 Alfred Lion – producer
 Rudy Van Gelder – engineer

References

1967 albums
Stanley Turrentine albums
Blue Note Records albums
Albums arranged by Duke Pearson
Albums produced by Alfred Lion
Albums recorded at Van Gelder Studio